Llamrei was a mare owned by King Arthur, according to the Welsh tale "Culhwch and Olwen".

Close to Llyn Barfog in Wales is a hoof-print etched deep into the rock "Carn March Arthur", or the "Stone of Arthur's Horse", which was supposedly made by King Arthur's mount, Llamrei, when it was hauling the terrible Addanc, or "afanc" monster, from the lake.

See also
Hengroen
Petrosomatoglyph
List of historical horses

References

Horses in mythology
Welsh mythology
Arthurian characters